Peter Pierse (died 4 September 1991) was an Australian rugby league referee.

Pierse began his refereeing career in the Newtown District Junior Rugby League. He was subsequently graded to referee in the New South Wales Rugby League (NSWRL). He refereed two first grade matches in 1981.

References

External links
Peter Pierse, of Eastlakes, at his office desk after his promotion to refereeing first grade matches of Rugby League.

1991 deaths
People from New South Wales
Australian rugby league referees
Rugby league referees from Newtown
1947 births